Julius Cherry Powell (January 23, 1926 – 1988) was an American academic teacher and the seventh president of Eastern Kentucky University.

Early life and education
Julius Cherry Powell was born January 23, 1926, in Harriman, Tennessee, to  Julius K. and Lucille C. Powell.  He graduated from Harrodsburg High School in 1944 and then attended the University of Kentucky after two years in the military.  He received his Master of Education Degree from the University of Louisville in 1952 and later received his Doctor of Education degree from the University of Kentucky in 1970.

Secondary education work
Powell served as a high school mathematics teacher at Atherton High School in Louisville, Kentucky, from 1950 until 1953.  From 1953 to 1957 he held a variety of positions including Assistant Director of Curriculum, Director of Instructional Services, and Assistant to Superintendent of the Louisville Public Schools.

University work
From 1957 to 1960 he was a divisional director for the Kentucky Department of Education and joined the staff of Eastern Kentucky University in 1960 as an Executive Assistant to the President.

Powell held a variety of positions at Eastern Kentucky University including Dean of Business Affairs, Executive Dean, and Vice-President for Administration.

Powell became the 7th president of Eastern Kentucky University following Robert R. Martin's retirement in 1976.  He served as president until 1984 and was succeeded by Dr. Hanley Funderburk.

Death
Powell died in 1988 and was survived by his wife of 38 years, Elizabeth D. Case, and his two daughters Karen and Julia.

Legacy
Built in 1971 the  $5.4 million J.C. Powell Building (Eastern's Student Center) houses meeting and conference rooms, a food court, the campus cafeteria, student lounges, a bowling alley, and an arcade.  (The bowling alley and arcade are now closed) The Powell Student Center recently underwent an extensive renovation and reopened in 2019. It houses the Student Government Association offices, along with the offices of other student affairs-related organizations

References

1926 births
1988 deaths
People from Harriman, Tennessee
People from Kentucky
University of Kentucky alumni
University of Louisville alumni
Presidents of Eastern Kentucky University
20th-century American academics